The 2016 World Allround Speed Skating Championships was held in Berlin, Germany, from 5 to 6 March 2016.

Schedule

Medal summary

Medal table

Medalists

References

External links
ISU website

 
World Allround Speed Skating Championships
World Allround Speed Skating Championships
2016 Allround
World Allround Speed Skating Championships
Speed skating in Berlin
2016 in Berlin
Sports competitions in Berlin
March 2016 sports events in Germany